Mas'ud-i Sa'd-i Salmān was an 11th-century Persian poet of the Ghaznavid empire who is known as the prisoner poet. He lived from ca. 1046 to 1121.

Early life
He was born in 1046 in Lahore to wealthy parents from Hamadan, present-day Iran. His father Sa'd bin Salman accompanied the Ghaznian Prince Majdûd under the Sultan Mahmûd's orders to garrison Lahore. Mas'ud was born there and he was highly learned in astrology, hippology, calligraphy, literature and also in Arabic and Indian languages. 

His first work of note was as a panegyrist in the retinue of Sultan Ibrâhîm's son Sayf al-Dawla Mahmûd, whose appointment to governor-general of India in 1076 Mas'ud marked with a qasideh.

In prison
In 1085, he was imprisoned, in the fortress of Nay, for his complicity with Sultan Ibrâhîm's son, Mahmud. He was released by the sultan's successor Mas‘ûd III in 1096, who appointed him royal librarian. He came under the patronage of Abu Nasr Farsi, deputy governor of India, and was appointed governor of Jallandar. Two years later, continued political changes resulted in a prison stay of 8 years, with his release in 1106. The last years of his life was spent in high favor, serving four consecutive sultans as librarian and panegyrist.

Poetry
He is known as a great Persian poet and is particularly notable for his use of conventional language and personal tone. 

Most of his works are written in the qasideh form. He has some poems in other styles such as quatrain and qet'eh. In the qasideh he followed the famous Unsuri.

During one of his prison stays, he wrote the Tristia, a celebrated work of Persian poetry. He had relationships with some of the Persian poets, including Othman Mokhtari, Abu-al-Faraj Runi, and Sanai.

One of his famous qasidehs about the prison named ای وائی امید ہائے بسیارم:

 شخصي به هزار غم گرفتارم  در هر نفسي بجان رسد كارم
I am fallen person in a thousand sorrows
In each breath my life's looking in end
 بي زلت و بي گناه محبوسم  بي علت و بي سبب گرفتارم
with no sin I am prisoner
with no reason fallen in trouble
 خورده قسم اختران به پاداشم  بسته كمر آسمان به پيكارم
stars have sworn to hurt me
the sky has come to fight with me
 امروز به غم فزونترم از دي  امسال به نقد كمتر از پارم
today in pains I'm higher than the yesterday
this year my soul's lesser than last year
 ياران گزيده داشتم روزي  امروز چه شد كه نيست كس يارم؟
I had many selected friends
what has become no one's remain
 هر نيمه شب آسمان ستوه آيد  از ناله سخت و گريه ي زارم
every night the sky's made sad
with my painful sadness cryings
 محبوس چرا شدم نمي دانم   دانم كه نه دزدم و نه عيارم
I fell in jail, why? I don't know
I just know: I'm not still nor wicked
 بسيار اميد بود بر طبعم  اي واي اميد هاي بسيارم
to much desires I had before
oh alas! where is my lost desires

Couplet:
Transliteration: Gardoon beh ranj o dard mara kushteh bood agar! 
Paiwand e umr e man neh shudey nazm e jan fizaaey!

Translation: 
Had this sky (fate) got me killed with grief and pain (in my imprisoned state)! 
This patch (of garment) of my life would not have yielded life giving poetry!

Notes

References
 Jan Rypka, History of Iranian Literature. Reidel Publishing Company. ASIN B-000-6BXVT-K
 Selected Masud Sa'd Salman poems by Dr. Ismail Hakemi, Amir kabir publishing association,

See also

List of Persian poets and authors
List of people from Lahore
Persian literature

1046 births
1121 deaths
11th-century Persian-language poets
12th-century Persian-language poets
11th-century Iranian people
12th-century Iranian people

Ghaznavid-period poets
People from Lahore